The Brunton Theatre is a mid-scale performing arts venue in Musselburgh, East Lothian, Scotland. It is part of a wider complex, incorporating council offices, and called Brunton Memorial Hall.
 
The building is textured concrete and glass, and was designed by William Kininmonth, with a gilded relief sculpture by Tom Whalen, a Scottish sculptor, on the facade (not to be confused with Tom Whalen the American writer and scholar). Queen Elizabeth, the Queen Mother opened it in 1971. The name derives from John D. Brunton, son of John Brunton, the founder of the Brunton Wireworks. He died in 1951 and left a bequest of £700,000 to the people of Musselburgh for the purpose of creating a community hall. The Town Council supplemented this and created a larger scheme which incorporated their offices.

There are two performance spaces in the building: a 300 capacity theatre, with notably clear sightlines, and a main hall upstairs, which seats 500. The main hall (also known as "Venue 1") hosts classical music concerts, comedy and contemporary dance performances, as well as regular cinema screenings and live screenings from the National Theatre and Royal Opera House. The theatre underwent refurbishment in the late 1990s, while the entire building was refurbished in 2010-11 for £3.2 million. There is also a curved bar area, and artwork around the theatre complex by Glasgow-based glass artist Deborah Campbell. Venue hire is managed by East Lothian Council, while artistic programming is organised by the Brunton Theatre Trust, established in 1994.

Children's theatre company, Catherine Wheels, are the resident company, and the theatre also acts as venue 191 at the Edinburgh Festival Fringe.

References

External links
Official website
 

Theatres in Scotland
Buildings and structures in East Lothian
1971 establishments in Scotland